Robin Peter Kendall Bachman (February 18, 1953 – January 12, 2023) was a Canadian drummer and the youngest brother of guitarist, singer and songwriter Randy Bachman. He was the original drummer for both the Brave Belt and Bachman–Turner Overdrive bands. He was most often credited as "Robbie" or "Rob" on the liner notes of Brave Belt and BTO albums.

Biography 
While growing up, Bachman practised the drums at home, often playing along with his older brother Randy. In 1971, Randy offered the Brave Belt drumming job to his then-18-year-old brother, and Robbie accepted. Other members of Brave Belt were Chad Allan and Fred Turner. Robbie co-wrote the song "Summer Soldier" for the 1972 Brave Belt II album. Later in 1972, another Bachman brother, Tim, joined Brave Belt after the departure of Allan.

When Brave Belt changed their name to Bachman–Turner Overdrive (BTO) in 1973, Robbie was credited with designing the BTO 'gear' logo. BTO enjoyed a period of peak popularity between 1973 and 1976, releasing five Top 40 albums, six U.S. Top 40 singles, and eleven Top 40 singles in Canada. Robbie co-wrote (with Fred Turner) one of Bachman–Turner Overdrive's biggest hits, "Roll On down the Highway" (Billboard No. 14 and RPM No. 4 in 1975). He remained with BTO until late 1979, after their tour supporting the 1979 album Rock n' Roll Nights had ended.

In 1984, Robbie declined to join a reformation of BTO due to licensing issues with brother Randy. He also opposed Randy's decision to include Tim Bachman as the second guitarist, instead of Blair Thornton. He was replaced on that 1984 album and supporting tours by former Guess Who drummer Garry Peterson. Robbie later rejoined the Not Fragile line up of BTO for reunion tours lasting from 1988 until 1991, after which Randy Bachman left the band. Robbie and the rest of the group, with replacement guitarist/vocalist Randy Murray, toured as BTO until the end of 2004. The only new material to come from this line-up is found on the 1996 album Trial By Fire: Greatest & Latest.

In 2009, Fred Turner and Randy Bachman reunited and began recording a new album, which was released in September 2010 under the name "Bachman & Turner" to coincide with a world tour. Robin Bachman and Blair Thornton had brought a lawsuit against Randy Bachman in an effort to prevent him and Turner from touring under the Bachman–Turner Overdrive or BTO name.

On March 29, 2014, Robbie and the Not Fragile line-up of Bachman-Turner Overdrive were inducted into the Canadian Music Hall of Fame.

Death

Bachman died on January 12, 2023, aged 69. He is survived by his wife Chrissy. His death was confirmed by his brother and bandmate Randy Bachman.

References

External links
 Robin Bachman – Know Name Records Interview
 BTO musicians tour for their devoted fans – 1997 article
 Website for BTO – Archived
 Web site features photos of BTO in concert

1953 births
2023 deaths
20th-century Canadian drummers
Bachman–Turner Overdrive members
Canadian rock drummers
Canadian male drummers
Canadian people of German descent
Canadian people of Ukrainian descent
Musicians from Winnipeg